Barbara Ellen Wilson (née Jordan; born 5 May 1952) is an Australian former sprinter who competed in the 1976 Summer Olympics. She was a member of Australia's 4 × 100 metres relay, which finished in fifth position.

In 1976 she was a member of the Australian 4 × 200 metres relay team that broke the world record in a special time trial in Brisbane.

References

External links
  (archive)
Barbara Wilson (Jordan) at Australian Athletics Historical Results

1952 births
Living people
Australian female sprinters
Olympic athletes of Australia
Athletes (track and field) at the 1976 Summer Olympics
Olympic female sprinters